Rapper and singer Nicki Minaj has been featured in 89 music videos (55 as a lead artist and 51 as a featured artist), nine commercials, and four documentaries. Additionally, she has featured in four films: the animated Angry Birds Movie 2 where she plays as a pink bird named Pinky, the animated Ice Age: Continental Drift in which she voiced the woolly mammoth, Steffie, Barbershop: The Next Cut in which she plays a sassy recruit named Draya, and The Other Woman, in which she played Lydia, an opinionated law-firm assistant. In 2009, Minaj signed a recording contract with Young Money Entertainment, and released her first solo music video under the label (for the single "Massive Attack") in March 2010.

The rapper released the first music video from Pink Friday, "Your Love", in July 2010. It was directed by Director X, which premiered on MTV and featured Michael Jai White as Minaj's love interest. She released "Super Bass" as the fifth single from Pink Friday, with the accompanying music video released on 5 May 2011, being noted particularly for the "glow in the dark" lap-dance scene. She has accumulated 20 music videos on her Vevo account with over 100 million views. The rapper has five MTV Video Music Awards for her video work: Best Hip Hop Video for "Super Bass" (2011),  "Anaconda" (2015) and "Chun-Li" (2018), Best Female Video for "Starships" (2012), and Best Power Anthem as a feature in Megan Thee Stallion's "Hot Girl Summer" (2019).

Minaj has set the Vevo 24 hour viewing record with two separate videos in her channel, "Stupid Hoe" and "Anaconda", which earned 19.6 million views within its first 24 hours of release.

Music videos

As lead artist

As featured artist

Cameo appearances

Filmography

Documentaries

Television shows

Films as an actress

Films as a personality

Commercials

References

External links
mypinkfriday.com – Official website

Nicki Minaj
Nicki Minaj